The 1911 Illinois Fighting Illini football team was an American football team that represented the University of Illinois during the 1911 college football season.  In their sixth season under head coach Arthur R. Hall, the Illini compiled a 4–2–1 record and finished in fourth place in the Western Conference. Halfback Chester C. Roberts was the team captain.

Schedule

Awards and honors
 Chauncey Oliver, end
 Selected by Outing magazine for its "Football Honor List for 1911" selected by coaches from the East and West.
Paul Belting, guard
 Outing magazine "Football Honor List for 1911"

References

Illinois
Illinois Fighting Illini football seasons
Illinois Fighting Illini football